Monster Madness: Battle for Suburbia is a video game for the Xbox 360 and Microsoft Windows, developed by Artificial Studios and Immersion Games. Players are able to combine objects found around the town to create bigger and better weapons with which to destroy the monster menace. The game includes five environments and hundreds of enemies. Four-player cooperative play is available as well.

Gameplay
Players control one of four playable characters and attempt to escape the monster-infested locale, defeating various forms of zombies and other monsters and boss creatures in order to progress through the game. There are five chapters in Monster Madness: Suburban Nightmare, Shopping Maul, High School Hell, Cemetery Scary, and Evil Castle. Each chapter contains 3 to 5 stages.

Each character is armed with unique weapons and special moves. Each stage contains one secret character-specific melee weapon for all four characters.

While there are a large number of melee weapons in the world, the main focus is on the character's signature melee weapon and the various constructible and upgradable guns. Each character has a class of melee weapons that they feel most comfortable with. By using their favored weapon, they gain access to a powerful special attack once their power bar is charged to the max by killing enemies. In addition to the melee weapons, there are also 15 different guns that will be built using 25 different types of weapon parts scattered and hidden in each level. Each gun also has 3 different levels of upgrades which not only makes the gun more powerful, but can change the way it operates as well. For example, nailgun level 1 has players wielding two semi-automatic nailguns, while nailgun 3 has an extended clip and is fully automatic.

There are also features such as online play with up to 16 players on Xbox Live, and costumes for all players that can be unlocked during or after the game is complete.

Another iteration of this game entitled Monster Madness: Grave Danger for the PlayStation 3 includes major improvements on the game such as reworked cameras, a new tight control scheme, and full online Co-op accessibility for the Adventure mode, as well as 25 all-new Challenge modes.

Reception

The game received "mixed" reviews on both platforms according to the review aggregation website Metacritic.

See also
List of Games for Windows titles
Zombies Ate My Neighbors

References

External links
Monster Madness: Battle for Suburbia official website

2007 video games
Cooperative video games
Games for Windows certified games
Shoot 'em ups
SouthPeak Games
Unreal Engine games
Video games about vampires
Video games featuring female protagonists
Windows games
Xbox 360 games
Video games about zombies
Video games developed in Colombia
Video games developed in the United States
Multiplayer and single-player video games
Video games using PhysX